The International Bone and Mineral Society (IBMS) is a learned society in the field of bone and mineral metabolism, including osteoporosis and other diseases of bone.

History
IBMS started as the Parathyroid Conferences, a triennial event from 1960 to 1977.

In 1980, the group was incorporated in Quebec, Canada, under the name International Conferences on Calcium Regulating Hormones. 

In 1995, the name was changed to IBMS and it was registered as a 501(c)(3) organization with headquarters in Washington, D.C., United States. IBMS holds annual scientific meetings and publishes the scientific journal Bone. IBMS also publishes IBMS BoneKEy, an open access website. BoneKEy Reports is the official online journal of the society.

See also
 American Society for Bone and Mineral Research
 Australian and New Zealand Bone and Mineral Society

External links
 
 Bone
 BoneKEy

Charities based in Washington, D.C.
International scientific organizations
Osteology
Health charities in the United States
Scientific organizations established in 1980
Medical and health organizations based in Washington, D.C.